Răzvan Constantin Oaidă (born 2 March 1998) is a Romanian professional footballer who plays for Liga I club FCSB as a midfielder.

Career statistics

Club

Honours

Club 
FCSB

 Cupa României: 2019–20
 Supercupa României runner-up: 2020

References

External links
 
 

1998 births
Living people
People from Petroșani
Romanian footballers
Association football midfielders
Romania under-21 international footballers
Romania youth international footballers
Liga I players
FC Botoșani players
FC Steaua București players